Jan Holldack (born 11 May 1996) is a German semi-professional footballer who plays as a midfielder for Rot Weiss Ahlen.

Holldack is a product of the 1. FC Köln academy and represented Germany at U18 level. He began his professional career with English club Brentford and entered German lower-league football upon his departure in 2017.

Club career

Early years 
Adept in midfield or as a defender, Holldack began his career in his homeland with Hennef 05, before joining Bundesliga club 1. FC Köln in 2011. He made 78 appearances and scored six goals for the club's U17 and U19 teams between 2012 and 2015. He progressed to the club's reserve team in March 2015 and was an unused substitute during three Regionalliga West matches in March 2015. Holldack departed the Müngersdorfer Stadion at the end of the 2014–15 season.

Brentford 
Holldack moved to England to sign a two-year Development Squad contract with Championship club Brentford on 1 July 2015. He performed the role of a utility player during the 2015–16 season and scored 14 goals in 31 appearances. After featuring regularly during the 2016–17 pre-season, a spate of injuries saw Holldack called into the first team squad for the opening match of the season versus Huddersfield Town. He remained an unused substitute during the 2–1 defeat and made the first senior appearance of his career with a start in the following match, playing at right back in a 1–0 EFL Cup first round extra time loss to Exeter City on 9 August 2016. Despite failing to win a further first team call-up, head coach Dean Smith remarked in early January 2017 that Holldack had been "constantly" training with the first team squad.

After a period on trial with Sportfreunde Lotte at the club's winter training camp and featuring as an unused substitute during a 3. Liga match, Holldack moved on loan to Regionalliga West club Wuppertaler SV until the end of the 2016–17 season on 20 January 2017. He made his debut with a start versus Fortuna Düsseldorf II on 10 February and scored the first senior goal of his career in the 5–1 victory. Holldack made 13 appearances and scored three goals during his spell at the Stadion am Zoo. Holldack signed a one-year contract extension with Brentford on 22 June 2017, but after failing to win any further first team call ups, he departed the club on 31 August 2017.

KFC Uerdingen 05 
On 31 August 2017, Holldack returned to Germany to join Regionalliga West club KFC Uerdingen 05 on two-year contract. In what remained of the 2017–18 season, he made 26 appearances, scored two goals and celebrated promotion to the 3. Liga after victory in the Regionalliga promotion play-offs. Holldack made 19 appearances and scored one goal during the 2018–19 season and was part of the club's Lower Rhine Cup-winning squad. He was released in June 2019, after making 45 appearances and scoring three goals for the club.

Bonner SC 
On 2 July 2019, Holldack joined Regionalliga West club Bonner SC on a one-year contract. He made 15 appearances and scored three goals before his departure in January 2020.

VfR Aalen 
On 11 January 2020, Holldack transferred to Regionalliga Südwest club VfR Aalen on an 18-month contract. He failed to win a call into a matchday squad before the Regionalliga Südwest season was ended prematurely. After making three early-2020–21 season appearances, Holldack had his contract terminated by mutual consent on 2 October 2020.

Rot Weiss Ahlen 
In October 2020, Holldack transferred to Regionalliga West club Rot Weiss Ahlen. During what remained of the 2020–21 season, he made 28 appearances and scored five goals and departed the club at the end of the campaign.

RC Grasse 
On 21 July 2021, Holldack transferred to French Championnat National 2 club RC Grasse. Three weeks later, personal issues saw him depart the club.

Return to Rot Weiss Ahlen 
In August 2021, Holldack returned to Regionalliga West club Rot Weiss Ahlen and signed a two-year contract. He made 28 appearances and scored a career-high 9 goals during a mid-table 2021–22 season. Holldack's desire to leave the club during the 2022 off-season saw him frozen out of the squad, though he returned to the team for the opening match of the 2022–23 season.

International career 
Holldack won two caps for Germany at U18 level, appearing in matches versus Moldova U19 and Serbia U18 during a friendly tournament in Israel in December 2013.

Personal life 
During his second spell with Rot Weiss Ahlen, Holldack shared a flat with teammate Andreas Ivan.

Career statistics

Honours 
KFC Uerdingen 05
 Regionalliga promotion play-offs: 2018
Lower Rhine Cup: 2018–19

References

External links
 
 
 Jan Holldack at regio-sw.de
 Jan Holldack at rotweissahlen.de
 

1996 births
Living people
German footballers
Association football central defenders
Brentford F.C. players
Germany youth international footballers
German expatriate footballers
German expatriate sportspeople in England
Association football midfielders
Wuppertaler SV players
Regionalliga players
KFC Uerdingen 05 players
3. Liga players
Bonner SC players
VfR Aalen players
Rot Weiss Ahlen players
Expatriate footballers in France
German expatriate sportspeople in France